Wald am Schoberpass is a municipality in the district of Leoben in the Austrian state of Styria.

Geography
The Schober Pass (elevation ) is a high mountain pass within the municipality. Wald am Schoberpaß lies on the Schober Pass between the Niederen Tauern and the Eisenerz Alps. The pass separates the watershed of the Palten, which flows into the Enns, and the Liesing, which flows into the Mur.

References

Cities and towns in Leoben District